Richard Andersen may refer to:

Richard A. Andersen (chemist) (1942–2019), American Professor of Chemistry at UC Berkeley
Richard A. Andersen (neuroscientist) (born 1950), American Professor of Neuroscience at Caltech

See also
Richard Anderson (disambiguation)